Mugga Lane Solar Park is a photovoltaic solar power station at Hume in the Australian Capital Territory.

Construction of the Mugga Lane Solar Park at Mugga Lane was completed in March 2017. It is owned by the Maoneng Group, which has been contracted by the Government of the Australian Capital Territory to produce up to 24,600 megawatt hours each year for up to $4.38 million.

The Mugga Lane Solar Park uses sheep for grass and weed control under the solar panels.

See also 
 Hume, Australian Capital Territory

References 

Solar power stations in the Australian Capital Territory